The 2017 Vuelta a España began on 19 August, with Stage 21 scheduled for 10 September. The 2017 edition of the cycle race began with the only team time trial stage of the race.

Classification standings

Stage 12
31 August 2017 — Motril – Antequera,

Stage 13
1 September 2017 — Coín – Tomares,

Stage 14
2 September 2017 — Écija – Sierra de La Pandera,

Stage 15
3 September 2017 — Alcalá la Real – Alto Hoya de la Mora, Sierra Nevada,

Rest day
4 September 2017 — Logroño

Stage 16
5 September 2017 — Circuito de Navarra – Logroño, individual time trial (ITT)

Stage 17
6 September 2017 — Villadiego – Los Machucos, Monumento Vaca Pasiega,

Stage 18
7 September 2017 — Suances – Santo Toribio de Liébana,

Stage 19
8 September 2017 — Caso, Redes Natural Park – Gijón,

Stage 20
9 September 2017 — Corvera de Asturias – Alto de l'Angliru,

Stage 21
10 September 2017 — Arroyomolinos – Madrid,

Notes

References

2017 Vuelta a España
Vuelta a España stages